Christiane Karg (born 6 August 1980) is a German operatic soprano. The award-winning singer became known for performing Mozart roles at the Salzburg Festival, and made an international career.

Career 
Born in Feuchtwangen, Bavaria, Karg studied at the Mozarteum, voice with Heiner Hopfner and Lied with Wolfgang Holzmair. She studied the Italian repertory for half a year at the conservatory of Verona. She graduated at the Mozarteum in 2008 and was awarded the Lilli Lehmann Medal. She took master classes with Grace Bumbry, Mirella Freni, Robert Holl and Ann Murray, among others. 

Karg made her debut at the Salzburg Festival in 2006, as Melia in Mozart's Apollo et Hyacinthus and as Weltgeist in his Die Schuldigkeit des ersten Gebots. A year later she appeared there as Madame Silberklang in his Der Schauspieldirektor and in a title role of his Bastien und Bastienne.

From the 2008/09 season, Karg was a member of the Frankfurt Opera where she appeared as Susanna in Mozart's Le nozze di Figaro, as Pamina in his Die Zauberflöte, as Musetta in Puccini's La bohème, Zdenka in Arabella by Richard Strauss, and the title role in Debussy's Pelléas et Mélisande. She appeared as Sophie in Der Rosenkavalier by Strauss in Frankfurt conducted by Sebastian Weigle, at the Semperoper conducted by Christian Thielemann, and at La Scala. She made her debut at the Royal Opera House in 2015 as Pamina in Mozart's Die Zauberflöte.

She performed the solo soprano part in Mahler's Second Symphony in a performance of the Rheingau Musik Festival 2017 at Eberbach Abbey, conducted by Christoph Eschenbach, with Gerhild Romberger, the SWR Vokalensemble,  and SWR Symphonieorchester.

Awards 
 2007: Neue Stimmen (6th prize)
 2008: Special Prize for Oratorio/Lied at the International singing competition "Tenor Viñas" of the Liceu in Barcelona
 2008: Award of the Hamel Foundation at the Schleswig-Holstein Musik Festival
 2009: Opernwelt Young Artist of the Year 2009
 2010: Winner of the ECHO Klassik 2010 in the category "Young Artist", "singing"
 2016: Winner of the ECHO Klassik 2016 in the category "Solistische Einspielung" (solo recording)
 2018: Brahms-Preis

Literature 
 Ursula Ehrensberger: Das Porträt – Christiane Karg. In: Das Opernglas 2010, No. 3, pp 26–30.

References

External links 
 
 Christiane Karg / Biografie Gasteig
 Christiane Karg (Soprano) Bach Cantatas Website
 
 

1980 births
Living people
People from Ansbach (district)
German operatic sopranos
Mozarteum University Salzburg alumni
21st-century German women  opera singers